J. Sean Essix is an American rapper from The Woodlands, Texas (Born in Birmingham, Alabama), known by the stage name Lil J. Sean.

Early life
In 2010, after his older brother Dougie died, Lil JSean was inspired to develop his hip-hop talents. In 2012, to honour his high school basketball team finishing the season undefeated, he created a viral music video and song called "#CPNATION". A year later, he won a talent show at Blinn College.

Career

Lil JSean released 1 mixtape in 2013, Flight, and 2 EPs in 2014, Black Friday and Yellow Tape. His song "Winner’s Circle" from Yellow Tape was the official walkout song for MMA fighter Brennan Ward. Lil JSean has seen his fair share of media, performances, and being interviewed on Great Day Houston and CW39's Eye Opener TV; being featured in the Houston Press for "Best Music in March", and also being featured in Billboard.
JSean has opened for some of the industry's record breaking artists such as Waka Flocka, Riff Raff, T-Mills, Nipsey Hussle and hosted and performed at West Virginia University's Spring Fling back in April 2016. He also recently teamed up with Kanye West’s artist Cyhi The Prynce as a feature on his new song "Long Damn Time"

Trust 'Em Release
His viral hit video received over a million hits on YouTube and was viewed over 3 million times on Twitter. Lil JSean and Aesja performed "Trust ‘Em" on Eye Opener TV.

Discography 

 Flight (2013)
 Black Friday – EP (2014)
 Yellow Tape – EP (2014) 
 Trust ’Em [Music Video] (2016)
 Cyhi Track [Music Video] (2016)
 Sky's Falling – Single (2017)

References

American rappers
Living people
Male hip hop musicians
21st-century American rappers
21st-century American male musicians
Year of birth missing (living people)